Adrian Mole: The Cappuccino Years is a British television series which was first aired on BBC One in 2001. The series was based on the fifth book from the Adrian Mole series, The Cappuccino Years. The series was produced by Tiger Aspect/Little Dancer Production for the BBC. Like the previous two TV series of Adrian Mole, this one also consists of 6 episodes. This was the final TV series produced based on the Adrian Mole series of books.

Premise
The series followed the plot of the book fairly closely and was set around 1997, starting in May 1997 when Tony Blair and New Labour won the general election.

Cast
Adrian Mole – Stephen Mangan
Pandora Braithwaite – Helen Baxendale
Pauline Mole – Alison Steadman
George Mole – Alun Armstrong
Ivan Braithwaite – James Hazeldine
Tania Braithwaite – Zoë Wanamaker
William Mole – Harry Tones
Sharon Bott – Ruth Jones
Glenn Bott – Alexander De'Ath
Archie – Joseph O'Conor
Rosie Mole – Melissa Batchelor
Nigel Hetherington – Roderic Culver
Peter Savage – Keith Allen
Eleanor Flood – Pooky Quesnel

References

External links
 
 
 

2001 British television series debuts
2001 British television series endings
2000s British comedy-drama television series
BBC comedy-drama television shows
Cappuccino Years (TV series)
Television series by Endemol
Television series by Tiger Aspect Productions
English-language television shows
Television series set in 1997
Television series set in 1998